"Comin' In and Out of Your Life" is a 1981 single released by Barbra Streisand on her album Memories.

Production
Milwaukeen Richard Parker worked with Bobby Whiteside to create jingles for a while, and then decided to use their musical hook skills to collaborate on a pop hit. Parker explained "we went into the studio and recorded a very complete demo with string arrangement and everything. some established artists were interested but we felt the song was just too strong to let go". Whiteside managed Parker's singing career and thought the song  was the "perfect vehicle to land Richard a contract with a major record label". Whiteside sent the tape to an L.A. partner Jay Landers, who then sent it to Charles Koppelman. Landers explained "I knew [Streisand] a little bit. We met through Charles Koppelman, who...was her Executive Producer at the time. I was an independent music publisher, and Charles asked me to find some material for a compilation he was working on with her, which became Memories. (I think it was called “Love Songs” in the UK.) So I brought her “Comin’ In And Out Of Your Life,” which was a song I’d come across a few months earlier. Parker said "Koppelman was so knocked out by it that he sent a limousine for Jon Peters. Ten days later Barbra recorded our song in London. It all happened so fast". Parker later explained "having Barbra Streisand do the song automatically legitimized our standing as songwriters".

Release
The song was released in mid-November by Columbia Records, and as of December 4, 1981, had already become a Top 30 single. It was included on her greatest hits album Memories.

Critical reception
The song was voted the favorite adult contemporary song in the Wilmington area according to surveys by WMFD radio on January 1, 1982. On November 27, 1981, the song was 10th in the same list.
Streisand considers this distinction amongst her very greatest achievements.

Chart performance

References

1981 singles
1981 songs
Barbra Streisand songs